BC Sportul Studentesc Bucharest is a basketball club from Bucharest. Its women's team, which plays in the Divizia A, won three national championships in a row between 1975 and 1977, and it made several appearances in FIBA competitions until 1995.

Titles
 Divizia A (3)
 1975, 1976, 1977
 Cupa României (1)
 1976

2012-13 roster
 (1.90)  Vladinka Erak
 (1.88)  Sanja Knezević
 (1.87)  Roxana Bejan
 (1.87)  Adina Lovasz
 (1.87)  Cristina Perta
 (1.86)  Emina Demirović
 (1.85)  Milica Beljanski
 (1.82)  Taisia Lungu
 (1.78)  Nikolina Nikolić
 (1.75)  Brandie Hoskins
 (1.72)  Liliana Otrocol
 (1.71)  Florentina Ardeleanu
 (1.68)  Marina Ristić

References

Sportul Studentesc
Sport in Bucharest